Xylophanes germen is a moth of the  family Sphingidae. It is known from Mexico, Costa Rica, Guatemala and is found from Venezuela to Bolivia.

The wingspan is 72–85 mm. The forewing has a crenulated outer margin. The forewing upperside ground colour is olive green-grey. The transverse lines are indistinct, the basal and two antemedian lines are curved outward from the inner margin and then back towards the costa. The three postmedian bands are running transversely across the wing, distal to which may be a variably developed paler patch and an orange-brown patch.

Adults are probably on wing year-round.

The larvae feed on Psychotria correae, Psychotria elata, Psychotria eurycarpa and Exostema mexicanum and possibly other Rubiaceae species.

Subspecies
Xylophanes germen germen (Mexico, Costa Rica, Guatemala)
Xylophanes germen yurakano Lichy, 1945 (Venezuela to Bolivia)

References

germen
Moths described in 1890